Sun Yingsha (simplified Chinese: 孙颖莎; born 4 November 2000) is a Chinese table tennis player. She is the current world No. 1 in women's singles.

Career

2019
In the 2019 World Team Cup, Sun came back from down 10–7 in the deciding fifth game to defeat Mima Ito in the finals against Japan. In an interview in 2021, Sun referred to this match as her precious match.

2021
Sun started out 2021 as number two in the world rankings. However, after China's decision to withdraw from all international events until the Tokyo Olympics, Mima Ito passed Sun for the number two position in the world rankings. In April, ITTF amended the seeding system for the Olympics such that she would be seeded above Mima Ito.

In May, Sun was selected to represent China in the women's singles and team event at the Tokyo Olympics. In China's Olympic Scrimmage, Sun lost to Chen Meng in the finals of the first leg and to Wang Manyu in the semi-finals of the second leg. In June, Sun lost to Zhang Rui and again lost to Wang Manyu in a closed-door scrimmage.

Sun reached the finals of the women's singles in 2020 Tokyo Olympics, crushing Mima Ito, who was widely viewed as the biggest threat to China, handily 4–0 in the semi-finals. However, Sun lost to Chen Meng in the finals to take silver. After the match, Sun remarked that she was satisfied with how she has played, but Chen was simply the stronger player that day. Sun later teamed up with Chen Meng and Wang Manyu, to play in the women's teams event and made it to the final match on 5 August 2021. They scored a 3–0 victory over Japan to win the gold medal and continuing China's undefeated winning streak in the event.

In September, Sun reached the finals of the China National Games, but lost 4–0 to Wang Manyu.

Singles titles

See also
 List of Youth Olympic Games gold medalists who won Olympic gold medals

References

External links

2000 births
Living people
Table tennis players from Shijiazhuang
Chinese female table tennis players
World Table Tennis Championships medalists
Youth Olympic gold medalists for China
Table tennis players at the 2018 Summer Youth Olympics
Asian Games medalists in table tennis
Table tennis players at the 2018 Asian Games
Asian Games gold medalists for China
Medalists at the 2018 Asian Games
Olympic silver medalists for China
Medalists at the 2020 Summer Olympics
Olympic medalists in table tennis
Table tennis players at the 2020 Summer Olympics
Olympic gold medalists for China
Olympic table tennis players of China
21st-century Chinese women